Shizunai Dam  is a gravity dam located in Hokkaido Prefecture in Japan. The dam is used for power production. The catchment area of the dam is 863.8 km2. The dam impounds about 140  ha of land when full and can store 29800 thousand cubic meters of water. The construction of the dam was started on 1959 and completed in 1966.

References

Dams in Hokkaido